The taekwondo competition at the 2018 Central American and Caribbean Games was held in Barranquilla, Colombia from 20 to 23 July at the Coliseo Colegio Marymount.

Medal summary

Men's events

Women's events

Mixed events

Medal table

References

External links
2018 Central American and Caribbean Games – Taekwondo

2018 Central American and Caribbean Games events
Central American and Caribbean Games
2018
Taekwondo in Colombia